The Wade Institute for Science Education (formerly the Museum Institute for Teaching Science, or MITS, Inc.), based in Quincy, Massachusetts, United States, and founded in 1986, provides resources and professional development to informal and formal teachers of science, technology, engineering, and mathematics.

Known as the Museum Institute for Teaching Science (or MITS, Inc.) from 1986 through 2018, their name was changed in 2019 to the Wade Institute for Science Education.

In partnership with educators at science centers, technology centers, wildlife sanctuaries and natural history museums, the Wade Institute initiates and facilitates innovative STEM professional development programs for formal and informal educators. The Wade Institute provides SeaPerch Workshops, Focus Workshops, Customized Professional Learning Services, a Professional Development Seminar Series, and annual Summer Professional Development Institutes, with an aim of providing STEM professional development that teachers can use as a model for their classroom activities and curriculum.

Summer Professional Development Institutes are their cornerstone program, available as either hybrid or on-site courses for grades 3-8 or middle and high school educators.  These courses are held in regions across Massachusetts and participants are able to earn Professional Development Points (PDPs) and/or graduate credit from participating institutions.

References

External links 
Wade Institute Website

Educational institutions established in 1986
Museum organizations
Educational organizations based in the United States
Organizations based in Boston
Science education in the United States
Education in Boston
1986 establishments in Massachusetts